Jas Johal is a Canadian politician and media personality. He served as Member of the Legislative Assembly (MLA) of British Columbia for the electoral district of Richmond-Queensborough in the 41st Parliament of British Columbia (2017-2020), as part of the British Columbia Liberal Party caucus.

Early life and career
Born in Jalandhar, Punjab, India, Johal moved to British Columbia at the age of two with his family, growing up in the interior city of Williams Lake before resettling in Greater Vancouver. After graduating from the British Columbia Institute of Technology with a diploma in communications, he began his broadcasting career at Vancouver radio station CKNW AM980 in 1991, then joined BCTV (now Global BC) in 1994, eventually becoming a senior reporter with the station. He moved over to Global's national news division in 2005 as its BC correspondent, then became the network's Asia bureau chief in 2008, based in Beijing and New Delhi.

After leaving Global in 2014, he served as director of communications for the BC LNG Alliance, a trade group for the province's liquefied natural gas export industry, until 2016.

Politics
He was approached by the British Columbia Liberal Party to contest the new riding of Richmond-Queensborough in the 2017 provincial election, in which he defeated British Columbia New Democratic Party (NDP) candidate Aman Singh by 134 votes to become the riding's MLA. On June 12, 2017, he was named the Minister of Technology, Innovation and Citizens' Services, serving in that role for just over a month until the new NDP government was sworn in following the defeat of the Liberal minority government in a non-confidence motion.

For the remainder of the 41st Parliament, Johal served as the Official Opposition critic for Economic Development, Competitiveness, Trade and Technology. He sponsored one private member bill, the Reducing Waste Act (Bill M-206), on March 14, 2018, which sought to prohibit the retail sale of single-use beverage pods unless it is fully compostable.

Johal once again faced Aman Singh in the 2020 provincial election, this time losing to Singh. Following his defeat, he rejoined CKNW as host of The Jas Johal Show in August 2021.

Electoral Record

References

Living people
British Columbia Liberal Party MLAs
Canadian television reporters and correspondents
Canadian talk radio hosts
Members of the Executive Council of British Columbia
People from Richmond, British Columbia
21st-century Canadian politicians
Global Television Network people
Year of birth missing (living people)
Canadian politicians of Indian descent
Canadian politicians of Punjabi descent
British Columbia Institute of Technology alumni